Reilly, Ace of Spies is a 1983 British television programme dramatizing the life of Sidney Reilly, a Russian-born adventurer who became one of the greatest spies ever to work for the United Kingdom and the British Empire. Among his exploits, in the early 20th century, were the infiltration of the German General Staff in 1917 and a near-overthrow of the Bolsheviks in 1918. His reputation with women was as legendary as his genius for espionage.

The series was written by Troy Kennedy Martin, and based on the 1967 book Ace of Spies by Robin Bruce Lockhart, whose father R. H. Bruce Lockhart was one of Reilly's fellow spies. Sam Neill stars as the eponymous character. The theme music is the romance movement from Dmitri Shostakovich's The Gadfly Suite, though Shostakovich is not actually credited (Harry Rabinowitz is credited with the music).

Episodes
There are 12 episodes, each about 50 minutes in length (except the first, which is nearly 80).

Cast
 Sam Neill as Sidney Reilly
 Peter Egan as Major Charles Fothergill
 Ian Charleson as R. H. Bruce Lockhart
 Norman Rodway as Captain Mansfield Smith-Cumming
 Tom Bell as Felix Dzerzhinsky
 David Burke as Joseph Stalin
 Kenneth Cranham as Vladimir Lenin
 Leo McKern as Basil Zaharoff
 Jeananne Crowley as Margaret Callaghan Reilly (wife #1)
 Derek Newark as General Stoessel
 Donald Morley as Stanley Baldwin
 John Castle as Count Massino
 Celia Gregory as Nadina "Nadia" Massino (wife #2)
 Brian Protheroe as Shasha Grammaticoff
 Joanne Whalley as Ulla Glass
 Clive Merrison as Boris Savinkov
 Laura Davenport as Nelly "Pepita" Burton (wife #3)
 Joanne Pearce as Caryll Houselander 
 Michael Aldridge as Vladimir Nikolayevich Orlov
 Victoria Harwood as Natalia
 Anthony Higgins as Mikhail Trilisser
 John Rhys-Davies as Tanyatos
 Sebastian Shaw as Reverend Thomas
 Bill Nighy as Goschen
 David Ryall as Herr Glass
 David Suchet as Inspector Tsientsin
 Alex McCrindle as Captain MacDougal
 Alfred Molina as Yakov Blumkin
 Peter Howell as Baron Rothschild
 Lindsay Duncan as The Plugger
 Hugh Fraser as George Hill
 Malcolm Terris as Sykes
 Diana Hardcastle as Anna
 Prentis Hancock as Boris Souvarine
 Geoffrey Whitehead as Count Lubinsky
 Aubrey Morris as Mendrovovich
 Phil Smeeton as Chekist
 Michael Angelis as Artur Artuzov
 Alan Downer as Eduard Berzin
 Alan Bowerman as Lieberman
 Sara Clee as Fanya "Fanny" Kaplan

Critical reception
In a 1984 review for The New York Times, John Corry wrote, "much of 'Reilly' is eminently watchable simply because it is eminently watchable." He praised the production and Sam Neill's performance and summarized "a mixed bag of pleasures, but it's worth dropping in on, if not in whole, then at least in part."

Awards
Won 1984 BAFTA TV Award

Best Film Editors:
Edward Marnier
Ralph Sheldon

Home media
The series was issued on Region 1 DVD by A&E Home Entertainment, under licence from THAMES International, talkbackTHAMES and FremantleMedia Ltd on 22 February 2005.

References

External links
 .
 Reilly, Ace of Spies - BFI Screenonline

Television shows shot at EMI-Elstree Studios
Espionage television series
ITV television dramas
Television series set in the 1900s
Television series set in the 1910s
Television series set in the 1920s
Fiction set in 1901
Fiction set in 1904
Fiction set in 1905
Fiction set in 1906
Fiction set in 1910
Fiction set in 1917
Fiction set in 1918
Fiction set in 1924
Fiction set in 1925
1983 British television series debuts
1983 British television series endings
1980s British drama television series
Television shows produced by Thames Television
Television series by Fremantle (company)
World War I television drama series
Works about the Russian Revolution
English-language television shows
Television series by Euston Films
Films directed by Jim Goddard